The United States Department of the Interior (DOI) is one of the executive departments of the U.S. federal government headquartered at the Main Interior Building, located at 1849 C Street NW in Washington, D.C. It is responsible for the management and conservation of most federal lands and natural resources, and the administration of programs relating to Native Americans, Alaska Natives, Native Hawaiians, territorial affairs, and insular areas of the United States, as well as programs related to historic preservation. About 75% of federal public land is managed by the department, with most of the remainder managed by the Department of Agriculture's Forest Service. The department was created on March 3, 1849.

The department is headed by the secretary of the interior, who reports directly to the president of the United States and is a member of the president's Cabinet. The current secretary is Deb Haaland.

As of mid-2004, the department managed 507 million acres (2,050,000 km2) of surface land, or about one-fifth of the land in the United States. It manages 476 dams and 348 reservoirs through the Bureau of Reclamation,  national parks, monuments, historical sites, etc. through the National Park Service, and 544 national wildlife refuges through the Fish and Wildlife Service.

Despite its name, the Department of the Interior has a different role from that of the interior ministries of other nations, which are usually responsible for police matters and internal security. In the United States, national security and immigration functions are performed by the Department of Homeland Security primarily and the Department of Justice secondarily. The Department of the Interior has often been humorously called "the Department of Everything Else" because of its broad range of responsibilities.

History

Formation of the department
A department for domestic concern was first considered by the 1st United States Congress in 1789, but those duties were placed in the Department of State. The idea of a separate domestic department continued to percolate for a half-century and was supported by presidents from James Madison to James Polk. The 1846–48 Mexican–American War gave the proposal new steam as the responsibilities of the federal government grew. Polk's secretary of the treasury, Robert J. Walker, became a vocal champion of creating the new department.

In 1849, Walker stated in his annual report that several federal offices were placed in departments with which they had little to do. He noted that the General Land Office had little to do with the Treasury and also highlighted the Indian Affairs office, part of the Department of War, and the Patent Office, part of the Department of State. Walker argued that these and other bureaus should be brought together in a new Department of the Interior. A bill authorizing its creation of the department passed the House of Representatives on February 15, 1849, and spent just over two weeks in the Senate. The department was established on March 3, 1849, the eve of President Zachary Taylor's inauguration, when the Senate voted 31 to 25 to create the department. Its passage was delayed by Democrats in Congress who were reluctant to create more patronage posts for the incoming Whig administration to fill. The first secretary of the interior was Thomas Ewing.

Several of the domestic concerns the department originally dealt with were gradually transferred to other departments. For example, the Department of Interior was responsible for water pollution control prior to the creation of the Environmental Protection Agency. Other agencies became separate departments, such as the Bureau of Agriculture, which later became the Department of Agriculture. However, land and natural resource management, American Indian affairs, wildlife conservation, and territorial affairs remain the responsibilities of the Department of the Interior.

Controversies 
Secretary of the Interior Albert B. Fall was implicated in the Teapot Dome scandal of 1921. He was convicted of bribery in 1929, and served one year in prison, for his part in the controversy. A major factor in the scandal was a transfer of certain oil leases from the jurisdiction of the Department of the Navy to that of the Department of the Interior, at Fall's behest.

Secretary of the Interior James G. Watt faced criticism for his alleged hostility to environmentalism, for his support of the development and use of federal lands by foresting, ranching, and other commercial interests, and for banning The Beach Boys from playing a 1983 Independence Day concert on the National Mall out of concerns of attracting "an undesirable element". His 1983 resignation was prompted by a speech in which he said about his staff: "I have a black, a woman, two Jews and a cripple. And we have talent."

Under the Administration of President George W. Bush, the Interior Department's maintenance backlog climbed from $5 billion to $8.7 billion, despite Bush's campaign pledges to eliminate it completely. Of the agency under Bush's leadership, Interior Department Inspector General Earl Devaney has cited a "culture of fear" and of "ethical failure." Devaney has also said, "Simply stated, short of a crime, anything goes at the highest levels of the Department of Interior."

American Indians
Within the Interior Department, the Bureau of Indian Affairs handles some federal relations with American Indians, while others are handled by the Office of Special Trustee. The current acting assistant secretary for Indian affairs is Lawrence S. Roberts, an enrolled member of the Oneida Tribe in Wisconsin.

The department has been the subject of disputes over proper accounting for American Indian Trusts set up to track the income and distribution of monies that are generated by the trust and specific American Indian lands, which the government leases for fees to companies that extract oil, timber, minerals, and other resources. Several cases have sought an accounting of such funds from departments within the Interior and Treasury (such as the Minerals Management Service), in what has been a 15-year-old lawsuit. Some American Indian nations have also sued the government over water-rights issues and their treaties with the US. In 2010 Congress passed the Claims Settlement Act of 2010 (Public Law 111-291), which provided $3.4 billion for the settlement of the Cobell v. Salazar class-action trust case and four American Indian water rights cases.

On March 16, 2021, Deb Haaland, serving at that time as a member of Congress for New Mexico, took the oath of office as secretary, becoming the first American Indian to lead an executive department, and the third woman to lead the department.

Operating units

 Assistant Secretary for Policy, Management, and Budget
 Deputy Assistant Secretary for Policy and International Affairs
 Office of Environmental Policy and Compliance
 Office of International Affairs
 Office of Native Hawaiian Relations
 Office of Restoration and Damage Assessment
 Office of Policy Analysis
 National Invasive Species Council
 Deputy Assistant Secretary for Budget, Finance, Performance and Acquisition
 Office of Budget
 Office of Financial Management
 Office of Planning and Performance Management
 Business Integration Office [administers the Financial and Business Management System (FBMS)]
 Office of Acquisition and Property Management
 Office of Small and Disadvantaged Business Utilization
 Deputy Assistant Secretary for Human Capital and Diversity
 Office of Human Resources
 Office of Occupational Safety and Health
 Office of Strategic Employee and Organizational Development
 Office of Civil Rights
 Deputy Assistant Secretary for Technology, Information and Business Services
 Office of Collaborative Action and Dispute Resolution
 Appraisal and Valuation Services Office
 Interior Business Center
 Office of Hearings and Appeals
 Office of Facilities and Administrative Services
 Office of the Chief Information Officer
 Deputy Assistant Secretary for Public Safety, Resources Protection and Emergency Services (DAS-PRE)
 Office of Emergency Management (OEM)
 Office of Law Enforcement and Security (OLES)
 Office of Wildland Fire
 Office of Aviation Services (OAS)
 Interagency Borderlands Coordinator
 Deputy Assistant Secretary for Natural Resources Revenue Management
 Office of Natural Resources Revenue
 Assistant Secretary for Fish, Wildlife, and Parks
  National Park Service
  United States Fish and Wildlife Service
 Assistant Secretary for Indian Affairs
 Deputy Assistant Secretary for Management
 Office of the Chief Financial Officer (OCFO)
 Office of the Chief Information Officer (OCIO)
 Office of Human Capital Management (OHCM)
 Office of Planning and Policy Analysis (OPPA)
 Office of Facilities, Environmental and Cultural Resources (OFECR)
 Deputy Assistant Secretary for Policy and Economic Development
 Office of Indian Energy and Economic Development (IEED)
 Office of Indian Gaming (OIG)
 Office of Self-Governance (OSG)
  Bureau of Indian Affairs (BIA)
 Office of Indian Services (OIS)
 Office of Field Operations (OFO)
 Office of Justice Services (OJS)
 Office of Trust Services (OTS)
  Bureau of Indian Education (BIE)
 Office of External Affairs
 Office of Congressional and Legislative Affairs (OCLA)
 Office of Public Affairs (OPA)
 Office of Federal Acknowledgment (OFA)
 Office of Regulatory Management (ORM)
 Assistant Secretary for Land and Minerals Management
  Bureau of Land Management
 Office of Surface Mining Reclamation and Enforcement
 Bureau of Ocean Energy Management
 Bureau of Safety and Environmental Enforcement
 Assistant Secretary for Water and Science
 United States Geological Survey
 Bureau of Reclamation
Central Utah Project Completion Act Office
 Assistant Secretary for Insular and International Affairs
 Office of Insular Affairs
Office of International Affairs
Ocean, Great Lakes and Coastal Activities Program Office
 Solicitor
 Office of the Solicitor (SOL)
 Office of the Inspector General (OIG)
 Office of General Counsel
 Assistant Inspector General for Investigations
 Office of Investigations
 Assistant Inspector General for Audits, Inspections, and Evaluations
 Office of Audits, Inspections, and Evaluations
 Assistant Inspector General for Management
 Office of Management
 Associate Inspector General for External Affairs
 Associate Inspector General for Whistleblower Protection
 Strategy Management Office
 Associate Inspector General for Communications
 Chief Information Officer
 Special Trustee for American Indians
 Federal Executive Boards
 Interior Museum
 National Indian Gaming Commission (NIGC)

Awards 
DOI Convocation Honor Award is the most prestigious recognition that can be granted by the department.

The following awards are presented at the Honor Awards Convocation:

 Safety and Health Award of Excellence & Aviation Safety Award
 Distinguished Service Award
 Citizen’s Award for Bravery
 Valor Award

Regions 
In 2018, DOI established 12 organizational regions to be used across the department. These superseded 49 regions used across 8 agencies.

See also

 America's Great Outdoors Initiative
 Environmental policy of the United States
 USA.gov

References

Further reading
 Black, Megan. The Global Interior: Mineral Frontiers and American Power. Harvard University Press, 2018.
Utley, Robert M. and Barry Mackintosh; The Department of Everything Else: Highlights of Interior History; Dept. of the Interior, Washington, D.C.; 1989

External links

 
 Department of the Interior on USAspending.gov
 Department of the Interior in the Federal Register
 
 The Department of Everything Else: Highlights of Interior History 
 "Sex, Drug Use and Graft cited in Interior Department", The New York Times, September 10, 2008

 
1849 establishments in the United States
Government agencies established in 1849
Interior